Artyom Alyayev (born January 17, 1995) is a Russian professional ice hockey defenceman. He is currently playing with Amur Khabarovsk of the Kontinental Hockey League (KHL).

On September 18, 2014, Alyayev made his Kontinental Hockey League debut playing with Torpedo Nizhny Novgorod during the 2014–15 KHL season.

References

External links

1995 births
Living people
Amur Khabarovsk players
Dinamo Riga players
HC Lada Togliatti players
Russian ice hockey defencemen
HC Spartak Moscow players
Torpedo Nizhny Novgorod players
Sportspeople from Nizhny Novgorod